Roads of National Significance (RoNS) was a name given by the 5th National Party Government, to a programme to speed up road construction in New Zealand between 2009 and 2017.

RoNS were first announced on 20 March 2009 by Transport Minister, Steven Joyce, saying they were, "singled out as essential routes that require priority treatment". They were described as "routes that are critical to improving economic productivity and growth. . . The focus is on moving people and freight between and within these centres more safely and efficiently". Later in 2009, Prime Minister John Key, announced $11 billion in new State Highway investment over the coming decade, saying National wants to significantly improve our road network and help unclog New Zealand's growth arteries.

Between 2012 and 2015 petrol taxes and road user charges rose 9 cents a litre to pay for RoNS.  The proportion of the transport budget for new and improved state highways rose from 23.4% in 2009/2010, to 61.8% in 2011/2012. Funding for other transport, such as repairs and footpaths, fell by 26.1%. In 2013 that led to the Auditor General reporting a risk that prioritising RoNS created pressures on other road maintenance. From 2015 to 2020 average seal age rose from 6.86 to 7.96 years and average remaining seal life dropped from 2.18 to 1.23 years.

The seven RoNS projects were:

 Puhoi to Wellsford – SH1
 Completion of the Auckland Western Ring Route – SH20/16/18
 Auckland Victoria Park bottleneck – SH1
 Waikato Expressway – SH1
 Tauranga Eastern Corridor – SH2
 Wellington Northern Corridor (Levin to Wellington) – SH1
 Christchurch motorway projects

The effectiveness of RoNS has been queried, as only the second, third and fifth of these projects have been completed, though Christchurch's motorways were largely open by the end of September 2020. The Waikato Expressway is delayed till 2021, Puhoi to Wellsford until 2022, Wellington Northern Corridor's Transmission Gully till 2021 and Kapiti Expressway even later. Central Wellington sections were never started due to rejection of the Basin Reserve flyover by a Board of Inquiry in 2014, though $12m was spent on design and consenting. RoNS have also been criticised on grounds of safety, economic growth, urban planning, congestion and emissions.

There have also been defects in construction, which have required costly repairs and led to questions over how contracts were awarded.

Some of the RoNS had low cost benefit ratios. In a written answer in 2017, the Minister of Transport, Simon Bridges, said the Warkworth to Wellsford motorway would return a benefit of 25 cents for every dollar spent.

The state of RoNS schemes is set out below –

The total cost of RONS projects that are either complete, or under construction, is $9.6 billion, including Auckland's Northern Corridor project. That provides for around 250 kilometres of new or significantly upgraded roads at an average cost of around $35 million per kilometre.

On 29 January 2020 Prime Minister Jacinda Ardern, announced the Sixth Labour Government's $12 billion New Zealand Upgrade Programme. National Party leader, Simon Bridges, claimed the coalition government had just picked up where National left off. The Labour Party claims that, "National’s wish list was never funded, was never part of the Budget, and their projects failed to plan for the future. We’ve taken transport projects that were on NZTA’s plan, and they’ve been improved by including elements such as walking and cycling infrastructure, bus lanes and safety improvements". NZTA give ambiguous messaging. They say that, in developing four-lane corridors, they will investigate opportunities to use two lanes for public transport services, vehicles carrying multiple people, and possibly freight and that all projects will have separate walking and cycling provision, with a focus on getting people out of cars and providing safer, more efficient travel choices, as well as extra vehicle capacity. NZUP includes former RoNS plans (Whangārei to Port Marsden, Tauranga Northern Link, Te Puna to Omokoroa and Otaki to north of Levin), though it also includes $1.6 billion of spending on transport alternatives.

References

External links 
 Ministry of Transport maps of RoNS

State Highways in New Zealand